Gibbosporina thamnophora is a species of foliose lichen in the family Pannariaceae. It was described as a new species in 2016 by Arve Elvebakk and Per Magnus Jørgensen. The type was collected from Eungella National Park in Queensland, Australia, where it was found growing on bark in a tropical rainforest near Broken River. The specific epithet thamnophora combines the Greek thamnos ("shrub") and -phora ("carrier"), and refers to the finely branched, shrubby cephalodia that are "carried" by the chlorobiont. The lichen occurs in Australia and Papua New Guinea.

References

thamnophora
Lichen species
Lichens of Australia
Lichens of New Guinea
Lichens described in 2016
Taxa named by Per Magnus Jørgensen
Taxa named by Arve Elvebakk